Jane Burley (born 12 February 1971 in Liverpool) is a female field hockey midfielder from Scotland. She played club hockey for Giffnock Hutchesons Ladies, and made her debut for the Women's National Team in 1999. Burley works as a firefighter. Her mother played tennis for Lancashire.

References
 sportscotland

1971 births
Living people
Scottish female field hockey players
Field hockey players at the 2002 Commonwealth Games
Field hockey players at the 2006 Commonwealth Games
Sportspeople from Liverpool
Anglo-Scots
Commonwealth Games competitors for Scotland